Condori  (possibly from Aymara for condor) is a mountain in the Wansu mountain range in the Andes of Peru, about  high. It is situated in the Arequipa Region, La Unión Province, Puyca District, south of the lake named Ranracocha. Condori lies near Pichirhua and south of the river Ojoruro (possibly from Aymara and Quechua for Mimulus glabratus), also known as Sumana or Cotahuasi, which flows to the Cotahuasi Canyon in the southwest.

See also 
 Ancojahua
 Pillune

References 

Mountains of Peru
Mountains of Arequipa Region